Karel Toman (born as Antonín Bernášek) (1877–1946) was a Czech lyric poet.

References

External links

 Works by Karel Toman in the online catalogue of the Municipal Library in Prague (in Czech; no registration needed).
 Extensive Biography 

1877 births
1946 deaths
People from Kladno District
Czech poets
Czech male poets
Czech translators
Czech anarchists
Anarchist writers
Czechoslovak poets